San Francisco is a 1936 musical-drama disaster film directed by W. S. Van Dyke, based on the April 18, 1906 San Francisco earthquake. The film stars Clark Gable, Jeanette MacDonald and Spencer Tracy. MacDonald's singing helped make this film a major hit, coming on the heels of her other 1936 blockbuster, Rose Marie.

Plot
On New Year's Eve, 1905, saloon keeper "Blackie" Norton hires Mary Blake to sing in his bar, the Paradise Club on Pacific Street in the notorious Barbary Coast of San Francisco. Mary becomes a star attraction at the Paradise, especially for her signature tune, "San Francisco". Blackie's friend Matt predicts that Mary will not stay long on the "Coast".

Blackie decides to run for the San Francisco Board of Supervisors at the behest of his childhood friend Father Tim Mullen, who believes Blackie can use the supervisor position to implement reform.

Mary is hired by the Tivoli Opera House on Market Street, where she becomes involved with Nob Hill scion Jack Burley. After her performance one night, Blackie visits Mary in her dressing room. Realizing she still loves him, Mary asks him to marry her. Blackie agrees, but their reunion is soon interrupted by Burley, who had proposed to Mary prior to the show. Burley appeals to Mary, but Blackie presents Mary with an ultimatum by asking if she wants to marry him or stay at the Tivoli. Mary chooses to return to the Paradise.

Backstage on the opening night of her return performance, Father Tim drops in and is angered by Mary's skimpy stage costume. He defies Blackie to put her on the stage in front of the rowdy Paradise audience. Mary decides to leave with the priest after Blackie strikes him in the face.

Mary goes back to Burley and meets his mother at her Nob Hill mansion. Mrs. Burley tells Mary that she had a "Blackie" in her younger days, but chose to marry the more steadfast Burley. This cements Mary's decision to accept Burley's proposal of marriage.

On the evening of April 17, 1906, Burley has the San Francisco Police Department raid the Paradise. Blackie, distraught about the future of his club, ends up at the city's annual Chickens Ball. After performances by acts from the other clubs, the MC requests the Paradise's entry. When no one steps on stage, Mary, just having learned of the club's closing, enters the competition on behalf of the Paradise. She rouses the audience to join in a chorus of "San Francisco" and wins. but Blackie refuses the prize money and states that Mary had no right to sing on behalf of his club. Mary is about to leave the ball with Burley when the earthquake hits the city.

As Blackie wanders the devastated city searching for Mary, he finds Burley dead and Mrs. Burley distraught. Blackie also comes upon a dying Matt, who tells Blackie he was wrong about Mary. Blackie later meets Father Tim, who takes him to a homeless camp in Golden Gate Park. Blackie hears Mary singing "Nearer, My God, to Thee" with those in mourning. As they reunite, word spreads through the camp that "The fire's out!" As people shout about building a new San Francisco, Blackie and Mary join the crowd as they leave the park marching arm-in-arm, singing "The Battle Hymn of the Republic".

Cast

 Clark Gable as Blackie Norton
 Jeanette MacDonald as Mary Blake
 Spencer Tracy as Father Tim Mullin
 Jack Holt as Jack Burley
 Jessie Ralph as Mrs. Burley
 Ted Healy as Mat
 Shirley Ross as Trixie
 Margaret Irving as Della Bailey
 Harold Huber as Babe
 Edgar Kennedy as Sheriff
 Al Shean as The Professor
 William Ricciardi as Signor Baldini
 Kenneth Harlan as Chick
 Roger Imhof as Alaska
 Charles Judels as Tony (credited as Charles Judells)
 Russell Simpson as Red Kelly
 Bert Roach as Freddie Duane
 Warren B. Hymer as Hazeltine
 Frank Mayo as Dealer (uncredited) 
 Jerry Tucker as Choirboy (uncredited) 
 Frank Sheridan as Founders' Club Member (uncredited)

Production

The earthquake montage sequence was created by 2nd unit director and montage expert John Hoffman. The Barbary Coast barroom set was built on a special platform that rocked and shook to simulate the historic tremor (similar sets were built for the 1974 disaster film Earthquake.)

Famous silent film directors D. W. Griffith and Erich von Stroheim worked on the film without credit. Griffith directed some of the mob scenes while von Stroheim contributed to the screenplay.

There are two versions of the ending. The original release features a stylish montage of then-current (1936) scenes of a bustling San Francisco, including Market Street and the construction of the Golden Gate Bridge. When the film was re-released in 1948, it was thought these scenes were dated and the film fades out on a single long shot of the modern business district. However, the TV and 16mm versions of the film seen in the 1950s and 60s were struck from the original version which includes the montage. The current DVD and cable version features the shorter, 1948 version.

Gable and Tracy also made two other films together, Test Pilot and Boom Town, before Tracy eventually insisted on the same top billing clause in his MGM contract that Gable had enjoyed, effectively ending one of the American cinema's most famous screen teams.

Gable had played an extremely similar character also named "Blackie" two years earlier in the smash hit gangster epic Manhattan Melodrama, with William Powell and Myrna Loy.

Music

The title song may be the best-remembered part of the film. It was composed by Bronisław Kaper and Walter Jurmann, with lyrics by Gus Kahn. It is sung by Jeanette MacDonald a half-dozen times in the film, and becomes an anthem for the survivors of the earthquake. It has now become a popular sentimental sing-along at public events such as the city's annual earthquake commemoration, as well as one of two official city songs; the other being "I Left My Heart in San Francisco". At San Francisco's historic Castro Theatre, the pre-film organ performance always ends with the song as the organ console is lowered down before the film starts.

Early in the film, the song "The Darktown Strutters Ball" can be heard; this is a historically inaccurate inclusion, since the song was written in 1917.

During the two operatic scenes in the film, MacDonald sang excerpts from Charles Gounod's Faust and Giuseppe Verdi's La Traviata. Another song she sings is The Holy City.

Box office
According to MGM records the film grossed a total – domestic and foreign – of $5,273,000: $2,868,000 in the US and Canada and $2,405,000 elsewhere. It made a profit of $2,237,000.

Reception

Academy Awards
The film won one Academy Award and was nominated for five more.

Other awards

Footnotes

References

External links

 
 
 
 
 
 San Francisco at Jeanette MacDonald and Nelson Eddy: A Tribute
 San Francisco at Virtual History
 San Francisco showing at the Regal Stonehouse Glos 1937
 San Francisco Brief Synopsis at Turner Classic Movies Archives Database

1936 films
1936 drama films
1930s disaster films
American drama films
American disaster films
American black-and-white films
Films about the 1906 San Francisco earthquake
Films set in 1906
Films set in San Francisco
Films shot in San Francisco
Films that won the Best Sound Mixing Academy Award
Metro-Goldwyn-Mayer films
Films directed by W. S. Van Dyke
Films with screenplays by Anita Loos
Barbary Coast, San Francisco
Photoplay Awards film of the year winners
Films scored by Bronisław Kaper
Films scored by Edward Ward (composer)
Films scored by Walter Schumann
1930s English-language films
1930s American films